Man Down may refer to:
Man Down (film), a 2015 film starring Shia LaBeouf
"Man Down" (song), a 2011 single by Rihanna
"Man Down" (Shakka song) (2018)
Man Down (TV series), a British sitcom starring Greg Davies
"Man Down" (CSI: Miami episode)
"Man Down" (Holby City), an episode of Holby City